The All India Jamhur Muslim League was formed in 1940, to counter the Lahore resolution, passed by the All-India Muslim League, for a separate Pakistan based on Muhammad Ali Jinnah's Two nation theory.

The first session of the party was held at Muzaffarpur in Bihar. The Raja of Mahmoodabad was elected president and Dr. Maghfoor Ahmad Ajazi was elected General Secretary. Later, the Raja of Mahmoodabad changed his mind under influence of Jinnah, who was a long time family friend, and rejoined Jinnah in 1941. A major faction of the Jamhur Muslim League under the leadership of Dr. Ajazi merged with Congress to strengthen its view of opposing the partition of India.

References

See also 
All India Azad Muslim Conference

1940 establishments in India
Political parties established in 1940
Political parties disestablished in 1941
Islamic political parties in India
Muslim League breakaway groups
Muslim League
Pakistan Movement